Neeltje Jans is an artificial island in the Netherlands in the province of Zeeland, halfway between Noord-Beveland and Schouwen-Duiveland in the Oosterschelde. It was constructed to facilitate the construction of the Oosterscheldedam.

After the construction, a fun park with attractions and other various expositions were built on the island, which are now connected to the shore through the dam. Another addition of the island is a nature reserve.

The island was named after a nearby sand bank. The name of this sandbank has two possible origins:
 It could be named after a boat with the name Neeltje Jans, stranded on the sandbank. Neeltje is a Dutch first name (a diminutive from Cornelia or Neelie like in Neelie Kroes). Jans is a familiar surname (meaning a son or daughter of Jan).
It could be named after a goddess of the sea, Nehalennia.

The second stage of the 2015 Tour de France finished on Neeltje Jans on 5 July 2015.

Gallery

References

External links 
  Official web site
 

Artificial islands of the Netherlands
Islands of the Rhine–Meuse–Scheldt delta
Islands of Zeeland
Veere
Walcheren